Edward Hector Jones (6 March 1910 – 30 November 1989) was an  Australian rules footballer who played with Geelong in the Victorian Football League (VFL).

Notes

External links 

1910 births
1989 deaths
Australian rules footballers from Victoria (Australia)
Geelong Football Club players
Chilwell Football Club players